The 2015–16 Liga de Nuevos Talentos season was split in two tournaments Apertura and Clausura. Liga de Nuevos Talentos was the fourth–tier football league of Mexico. The season was played between 14 August 2015 and 7 May 2016.

Torneo Apertura

Changes from the previous season 
26 teams participated in this tournament.
Mineros de Fresnillo, 2014–15 season champion, remained in this division because the team did not meet the requirements to be promoted to the Liga Premier de Ascenso.
C.D. Uruapan and Sporting Canamy were promoted from Tercera División. Uruapan played Liga de Nuevos Talentos because the team did not meet the requirements to be promoted to the Liga Premier de Ascenso.
Topos de Reynosa moved to Chetumal and changed name to Tigrillos de Chetumal.
Due to the creation of reserve teams in Liga Premier de Ascenso, América Coapa, Chivas Rayadas, Pumas Naucalpan, Alto Rendimiento Tuzo and Cachorros UANL disappeared.
Alebrijes de Oaxaca "B" moved to Malinalco and changed its name to Colibríes de Malinalco.
New teams: Llaneros de Guadalupe, Tecomán F.C., FC Satélites and Deportivo Gladiadores.
Cañoneros de Campeche, Centro Universitario del Fútbol and Zitácuaro disappeared.

Stadiums and Locations

Group 1

Group 2

Regular season

Group 1

Standings 

Last updated on November 8, 2015.Source: SoccerWay

Results

Group 2

Standings 

Last updated on November 8, 2015.Source: SoccerWay

Results

Regular-season statistics

Top goalscorers 
Players sorted first by goals scored, then by last name.

Source: Liga Premier

Liguilla 
The four best teams of each group play two games against each other on a home-and-away basis. The higher seeded teams play on their home field during the second leg. The winner of each match up is determined by aggregate score. In the quarterfinals and semifinals, if the two teams are tied on aggregate the higher seeded team advances. In the final, if the two teams are tied after both legs, the match goes to extra time and, if necessary, a penalty shoot-out.

(tp) The team won the series by having a better position in the general table

Quarter-finals
The first legs was played on 14 and 15 November, and the second legs was played on 20, 21 and 22 November 2015.

First leg

Second leg

Semi-finals
The first legs was played on 25 and 26 November, and the second legs was played on 28 and 29 November 2015.

First leg

Second leg

Final
The first leg was played on 3 December, and the second leg was played on 6 December 2015.

First leg

Second leg

Torneo Clausura

Regular season

Group 1

Standings 

Last updated on April 3, 2016.Source: SoccerWay

Results

Group 2

Standings 

Last updated on April 3, 2016.Source: SoccerWay

Results

Regular-season statistics

Top goalscorers 
Players sorted first by goals scored, then by last name.

Source: Liga Premier

Liguilla 
The four best teams of each group play two games against each other on a home-and-away basis. The higher seeded teams play on their home field during the second leg. The winner of each match up is determined by aggregate score. In the quarterfinals and semifinals, if the two teams are tied on aggregate the higher seeded team advances. In the final, if the two teams are tied after both legs, the match goes to extra time and, if necessary, a penalty shoot-out.

(tp) The team won the series by having a better position in the general table

Quarter-finals
The first legs was played on 8, 9 and 10 April, and the second legs was Played on 16 April 2016.

First leg

Second leg

Semi-finals
The first legs was played on 20 April, and the second legs was played on 23 April 2016.

First leg

Second leg

Final
The first leg was played on 28 April, and the second leg was played on 1 May 2016.

First leg

Second leg

Relegation table 

Last updated: 3 April 2016 Source:Segunda DivisiónP = Position; G = Games played; Pts = Points; Pts/G = Ratio of points to games played

Promotion Final
The Promotion Final is a series of matches played by the champions of the tournaments Apertura and Clausura, the game is played to determine the winning team of the promotion to Liga Premier de Ascenso. 
The first leg was played on 4 May 2016, and the second leg was played on 7 May 2016.

First leg

Second leg

See also 
2015–16 Liga MX season
2015–16 Ascenso MX season
2015–16 Liga Premier de Ascenso season

References

External links 
 Official website of Liga Premier
 Magazine page 

 
1